Amphisbaena schmidti, known commonly as Schmidt's worm lizard or the Puerto Rican dusky worm lizard, is a species of amphisbaenian in the family Amphisbaenidae. The species is endemic to the Caribbean.

Etymology
The specific name, schmidti, is in honor of American herpetologist Karl Patterson Schmidt.

Geographic range
A. schmidti is found in Puerto Rico.

Habitat

Reproduction
A. schmidti is oviparous.

See also

Fauna of Puerto Rico
List of endemic fauna of Puerto Rico

References

Further reading
Gans C (1964). "Amphisbaena schmidti, a third species of the genus from Puerto Rico (Amphisbaenia: Reptilia)". Breviora (198): 1–11. (Amphisbaena schmidti, new species, pp. 3–11 + Figures 1–7).
Gans C (2005). "Checklist and Bibliography of the Amphisbaenia of the World". Bulletin of the American Museum of Natural History (289): 1–130. (Amphisbaena schmidti, p. 19).
Schwartz A, Henderson RW (1991). Amphibians and Reptiles of the West Indies: Descriptions, Distributions, and Natural History. Gainesville, Florida: University of Florida Press. 720 pp. . (Amphisbaena schmidti, p. 561).
Schwartz A, Thomas R (1975). A Check-list of West Indian Amphibians and Reptiles. Carnegie Museum of Natural History Special Publication No. 1. Pittsburgh, Pennsylvania: Carnegie Museum of Natural History. 216 pp. (Amphisbaena schmidti, p. 168).

schmidti
Reptiles of Puerto Rico
Endemic fauna of Puerto Rico
Reptiles described in 1964
Taxa named by Carl Gans